Naveh (also Romanized as Nāveh and Nova) is a village in Garmkhan Rural District, Garmkhan District, Bojnord County, North Khorasan Province, Iran. At the 2006 census, its population was 645, in 135 families.

References 

Populated places in Bojnord County